The electoral district of Lowan is a rural Victorian Legislative Assembly (Lower House) electoral district of the Victorian Parliament. It is located within the Western Victoria Region of the Legislative Council. It was initially created by the Electoral Act Amendment Act 1888, taking effect at the 1889 elections. It is the state’s biggest electorate by area, covering about 41,858 km².

Lowan includes the country towns of Casterton, Coleraine, Dartmoor, Dimboola, Hamilton, Horsham, Jeparit, Kaniva, Nhill and Rainbow. The current seat was established in 2002 although several previous seats held the same name.

The current member is The Nationals' Emma Kealy.

Members for Lowan

Election results

See also
 Parliaments of the Australian states and territories
 List of members of the Victorian Legislative Assembly

External links
 Electorate profile: Lowan District, Victorian Electoral Commission

References

Electoral districts of Victoria (Australia)
1889 establishments in Australia
1945 disestablishments in Australia
1955 establishments in Australia
1992 disestablishments in Australia
2002 establishments in Australia
Constituencies established in 1889
Constituencies established in 1995
Constituencies established in 2002
Constituencies disestablished in 1945
Constituencies disestablished in 1992
Shire of West Wimmera
Shire of Glenelg
Shire of Moyne
Hamilton, Victoria
Shire of Southern Grampians
Shire of Northern Grampians
Rural City of Horsham
Shire of Yarriambiack
Shire of Hindmarsh
Rural City of Ararat
Barwon South West (region)